Rudolph IV, Prince of Anhalt-Dessau (died 7 September 1510) was a German prince of the House of Ascania and ruler of the principality of Anhalt-Dessau.

He was the fifth son of George I, Prince of Anhalt-Dessau, as the fourth-born child of his fourth wife Anna, daughter of Albert VIII, Count of Lindau-Ruppin.

Life
The last of his father's sons to survive adulthood, Rudolph succeeded him in 1474 as co-ruler of the principality of Anhalt-Dessau with his older brothers Ernest I, George II, and Sigismund III.

He never married or had children; upon his death, Rudolph was succeeded by his only surviving brother, Ernest I.

Princes of Anhalt-Dessau
1510 deaths
Year of birth unknown